This is a list of mayors of Detroit, Michigan. See History of Detroit, Michigan, for more information about the history of the incorporation of the city.

The current mayor is Mike Duggan, who was sworn into office on January 1, 2014.

History of Detroit's executive authority
During the earliest part of its history, Detroit was a military outpost, and executive authority was wielded by first French, then British military commandants. Soon after the Detroit area was taken over by American forces, civil authority became more prominent, and executive authority was placed in the hands of a series of appointed officials, elected boards, and elected officials. This included a brief stint in 1806–1809 with a largely ceremonial mayor.

Detroit's current strong mayor system dates from the city's 1824 charter. From 1824 to 1857, mayors were elected to terms of one year; from 1858 to 1953 the term was increased to two years, and after 1953 mayoral terms were four years.

Early French and British leadership
During the early part of Detroit's existence, local authority was vested in French and British military commandants.  French commandants included:
 Antoine de la Mothe Cadillac (1701 – 1710)
 François de la Forêt (1710 - 1714)
 Jacques-Charles Renaud Dubuisson (1714)
 Pierre Alphonse de Tonty (1717 - 1727)
 Jean Baptist de St. Ours, Sieur Deschaillons (1728 - 1729)
 Louis Henry Deschamps, Sieur de Boishebert (1730 - 1733)
 Ives Jacques Hugues Pean, Sieur de Livandiere (1733 - 1736)
 Pierre Jacques Payan de Noyan, Sieur de Charvis (1739 - 1742)
 Pierre Joseph Celoron (1742 - 1744)
 Paul Joseph le Moyne, Chevalier de Longueuil (1744 - 1748)
 Pierre Joseph Celoron (second term, 1750 - 1754)
 Jacques Pierre Daneau, Sieur de Muy (1754 - 1758)
 Francois Marie Picote, Sieur de Belestre (1758 - 1760)

Seventeen British commandants led Detroit between 1760 and 1796.
 Major Robert Rogers (1760)
 Captain Donald Campbell (1760 – 1762)
 Major Henry Gladwin (1762 – 1764)
 Colonel John Bradstreet (1764)
 Lieutenant-Colonel John Campbell (1765 – 1766)
 George Turnbull (1766 – 1769)
 Captain James Stephenson (1770 – 1772)
 Captain George Etherington (1772)	
 Major Henry Bassett (1772 – 1774)
 Captain Richard Beringer Lernoult (1774 – 1779)
 Colonel Arent Schuyler de Peyster (1779 – 1784)
 Major William Ancrum (1785 – 1786)
 Thomas Bennett (1786)
 Captain Robert Matthews (1787 – 1788)
 Major Patrick Murray (1788 – 1790)
 Major John Smith (1790 – 1792)
 Colonel Richard England (1792 – 1796)

Early American leadership
When Detroit was turned over to the Americans in 1796, Colonel Jean François Hamtramck was named commander of Detroit, a position he held until his death in 1803.

The first local rule of Detroit was established in 1802, when Detroit was incorporated as a town.  The original incorporation provided for a Board of Trustees to govern the town, the chairman of which was the highest governmental position.  The first chairman of the Board, appointed on February 9, 1802, was James Henry.  Henry was elected to the position later in the year.  Subsequent elections were held in May of each year, with the chairmen of the Board of Trustees being:
 James Henry (1802 – 1803)
 James May (1803 – 1804)
 Solomon Sibley (1804 – 1805) 
 Joseph Wilkinson (elected 1805)

1806 charter
In 1805, a massive fire destroyed the town and effectively eliminated the government.  Governor William Hull and Judge Augustus Woodward dissolved the original incorporation, replacing it in 1806 with a government headed by an appointed mayor.   However, the position was largely honorary, and the two men who held it (Solomon Sibley and Elijah Brush) both quickly resigned upon realizing the lack of power in the office.  The legislation creating this mayoral position was repealed in 1809, after which de facto political power still resided with Hull and Woodward, and Detroit was without either a mayor or Board of Trustees until after the War of 1812.

Second Board of Trustees
After the war, a legislative act in 1815 ended the interregnum and returned political control to the citizens of Detroit through a Board of Trustees, elected yearly.  In October of that year, Solomon Sibley was elected as the first chair.  The chairs elected yearly  to this Board included:
 Solomon Sibley (1815 – 1816)
 George McDougall (1816 – 1817)
 Abraham Edwards (1817 – 1818)
 John R. Williams (1818 – 1819)
 James McCloskey (1819 – 1820)
 James Abbott (1820 – 1821)
 Andrew G. Whitney (1821 – 1822)
 James Abbott (second term, 1823 – 1824)
 Andrew G. Whitney (second term, 1822 – 1823)

1824 charter
In 1824, John R. Williams drew up a new city charter that provided for the first time for a directly elected mayor, with significantly increased executive powers. Following approval by the state legislature, Williams became the City of Detroit's first elected mayor.

1918 charter and nonpartisan elections
In June 1918 Detroit's first home-rule city charter came into effect, following passage by city voters in a referendum. The new charter mandated that all Detroit public offices be non-partisan, and that elections to those positions would be held on a non-partisan basis, with no party designations on the ballot. These provisions have been continued through all subsequent city charter revisions.

Since 1918, all mayoral elections in Detroit have been held on a non-partisan basis, and mayors have officially served unaffiliated with any political party.  Thus, the party affiliations given in the chart below for mayors elected after 1918 are not official and are based on the inferences of editors based on available historic information.

Official residence
Since 1966, the official residence of the Mayor of Detroit has been the Manoogian Mansion, located on Dwight Street in the Berry Subdivision Historic District, facing the Detroit River on the city's east side. The mansion was donated to the city by industrialist Alex Manoogian, founder of the Masco Corporation.

First incorporation
Two mayors served under the 1806 charter.

Reincorporation
The following mayors served under the stronger executive mayoral system begun in the 1824 charter:

Non-partisan elections
A new city charter went into effect in 1918, which required that all city offices be non-partisan. The following mayors were elected in non-partisan elections with no party designations on the ballot, and served on a non-partisan basis with no official party affiliation: This provision has been repeated in the subsequent city charters of 1974, 1997, and 2012: So, the party affiliations shown below are based on information from each mayor's personal and/or political history and do not represent any official status.

See also

 Timeline of Detroit
 History of Detroit
 Decline of Detroit

References

External links
The Early Government of Detroit

Detroit
 
Mayors